Navneet Dhaliwal (born 10 October 1988) is a Canadian cricketer who was the former captain of the Canada national cricket team.

Career
He made his List A cricket debut in the 2015 ICC World Cricket League Division Two tournament for Canada against the Netherlands on 17 January 2015.

In January 2018, he was named in Canada's squad for the 2018 ICC World Cricket League Division Two tournament. In September 2018, he was named in Canada's squad for the 2018–19 ICC World Twenty20 Americas Qualifier tournament. He was the leading run-scorer for Canada in the tournament, with 83 runs in six matches.

In October 2018, he was named in Canada's squad for the 2018–19 Regional Super50 tournament in the West Indies. He was the leading run-scorer for Canada in the tournament, with 271 runs in six matches. In April 2019, he was named in Canada's squad for the 2019 ICC World Cricket League Division Two tournament in Namibia. He was the leading run-scorer for Canada in the tournament, with 219 runs in five matches.

In June 2019, he was selected to play for the Edmonton Royals franchise team in the 2019 Global T20 Canada tournament.

In August 2019, he was named as the captain of Canada's squad for the Regional Finals of the 2018–19 ICC T20 World Cup Americas Qualifier tournament. He made his Twenty20 International (T20I) debut for Canada against the Cayman Islands on 18 August 2019. He finished the tournament as the leading run-scorer, with 190 runs in six matches.

In September 2019, he was named as the captain of Canada's squad for the 2019 Malaysia Cricket World Cup Challenge League A tournament. On 19 September 2019, in the match against Malaysia, he scored 140 runs from 94 balls, as Canada made 408/7 from their 50 overs. He finished the tournament as the leading run-scorer for Canada, with 250 runs in three matches. In October 2019, he was named as the captain of Canada's squad for the 2019 ICC T20 World Cup Qualifier tournament in the United Arab Emirates. Ahead of the tournament, the International Cricket Council (ICC) named him as the key player in Canada's squad.

In October 2021, he was named as the captain of Canada's squad for the 2021 ICC Men's T20 World Cup Americas Qualifier tournament in Antigua. In February 2022, he was again named as captain of the national side for the 2022 ICC Men's T20 World Cup Global Qualifier A tournament in Oman.

References

External links
 

1988 births
Living people
Canadian cricketers
Canada Twenty20 International cricketers
Cricketers from Chandigarh
Canadian sportspeople of Indian descent
ICC Americas cricketers